The 2016–17 George Washington Colonials women's basketball team represented George Washington University during the 2016–17 NCAA Division I women's basketball season. The Colonials, led by first year head coach Jennifer Rizzotti, played their home games at Charles E. Smith Center and were members of the Atlantic 10 Conference. They finished the season 20–10, 13–3 in A-10 play to share the A-10 regular season title with Dayton. They lost in the quarterfinals of the A-10 women's tournament to Duquesne. They received an automatic bid to the Women's National Invitation Tournament where they lost to Navy in the first round.

2016–17 media

WRGW will carry the Colonials games and broadcast them online at GWRadio.com. The A-10 Digital Network will carry all non-televised Colonials home games and most conference road games through RaiseHigh Live.

Roster

Schedule

|-
!colspan=9 style="background:#00285C; color:#EECFA1;"| Regular season

|-
!colspan=9 style="background:#00285C; color:#EECFA1;"| Atlantic 10 Women's Tournament

|-
!colspan=9 style="background:#00285C; color:#EECFA1;"| WNIT

Rankings

See also
 2016–17 George Washington Colonials men's basketball team

References

George Washington
George Washington Colonials women's basketball seasons
2017 Women's National Invitation Tournament participants